Asmita Law College is a law school located in the Vikhroli, Mumbai of India. It is affiliated to the University of Mumbai and is certified by the Bar Council of India.

Courses

The Law college offers the Bachelor of Laws course generally known as LLB, it offers three year full-time LLB for the graduates and five year integrated LLB for undergraduates

Admission

As the college is affiliated to the University of Mumbai, it has to follow University rules which states minimum 45 percent marks in the 12th Grade also known as Higher Secondary Certificate and 12th standard in India.

References

Law schools in Maharashtra
Universities and colleges in Mumbai
Affiliates of the University of Mumbai